Jonathan Magee (born 9 February 1972) is a Northern Irish academic and  former footballer.

Football career
Magee is the son of Eric Magee who played professional football in England for Oldham Athletic. Jonathan began his own career with two of his father's ex–clubs: Glenavon and Linfield. After moving to Bangor in January 1993, Magee became a prolific goalscorer and won an Irish Cup winners' medal. In 1994, he was given an appearance in the national Under 21 team by Bryan Hamilton.

In 1994–95 Magee had short loan spells in the English non–League with Kettering Town and Burton Albion. He returned to local football with Portadown, Distillery then Dungannon Swifts before retiring from the game due to a long–term ankle injury.

Academic career
Magee remained a semi-professional footballer by choice, stating: "I realised that for a long-term career it was better to look beyond the game." He attended Ulster University before gaining further qualifications at Loughborough University and Brighton University. He later worked as a senior lecturer at the University of Central Lancashire, while continuing to publish work on the sociology of sport.

Magee describes himself as a lifelong supporter of Glasgow Rangers and admits to regular attendance at Ibrox Stadium.

References

People from Lurgan
Association footballers from Northern Ireland
Northern Ireland under-21 international footballers
Association football forwards
Glenavon F.C. players
Linfield F.C. players
1972 births
Living people
Academics from Northern Ireland
Educators from Northern Ireland
Alumni of Ulster University
Kettering Town F.C. players
Burton Albion F.C. players
League of Ireland players
21st-century educators from Northern Ireland